Sandino is a 1990 Spanish-Nicaraguan biographical film about Nicaraguan revolutionary Augusto César Sandino, directed by Chilean filmmaker Miguel Littín and produced by Spanish Televisión Española and Nicaraguan state producer Umamzor. It was released in cinemas as a two hours long film first and it was broadcast in television as a three 55-minutes episodes miniseries later.

Plot 
The film depicts the life of Augusto César Sandino (1895-1934), the leader of the Nicaraguan resistance against the US occupation army between 1927 and 1933, as well as the National Guard that was organized against him after the Marines' defeat.

The movie features several real-life characters, including Calvin Coolidge (President of the United States), Nicaraguan dictator Anastasio Somoza, the country's President Juan Bautista Sacasa, Colonel Logan Feland and Captain Gilbert D. Hatfield of the Navy, as well as Blanca Aráuz Pineda, Sandino's wife and a telegraph operator from the town of San Rafael del Norte, Jinotega. Young workers who fought alongside Sandino, such as generals Francisco Estrada, José Gregorio Colindres, and Pedro Altamirano Pedrón, as well as Teresa Villatoro, Sandino's mountain wife, also make appearances.

Cast 
 Joaquim de Almeida - Augusto César Sandino
 Kris Kristofferson - Tom Holte
 Dean Stockwell - Captain Hatfield
 Ángela Molina - Teresa Villatoro
 Victoria Abril - Blanca Arauz
 Omero Antonutti - Don Gregorio Sandino
 Blanca Guerra - Rossana
 Ernesto Gómez Cruz - Farabundo Martí
 José Alonso - Anastasio Somoza García
 Fernando Balzaretti - Estrada

References

External links 

1990s biographical films
1990s Spanish-language films
Spanish biographical films
RTVE shows